Jaysuk Zdpayo is a Gujarati film about a main lead character Jaysuk which is played by Jimit Trivedi,  who is burdened by his father’s debt and working for the Mansukh which is played by Johnny Lever. Directed and produced by Taarak Mehta Ka Ooltah Chashmah fame Dharmessh Mehta.

Plot  
This is the story of a guy name Jaysuk whose father has left tremendous amount of debt on him, while he is single earning person and he has to repay back of his father debt. Jaysuk comes to Ahmedabad city and got a job in firm, he falls in love with Jigna his co worker, meanwhile his boss’s sister (Kiran) comes back to india after completing her graduation from london and falls in love with Jaysuk. Now his Boss Mansukh force to Jaysuk to marry his sister, Jaysuk denies it and ask his friends to help him. Sushil (Jaysuk’s friend) tells lie to Mansukh . Now the boss fires him and here the problems starts in Jaysuk’s life.

Cast 
 Johnny Lever as Mansukh 
 Jimit Trivedi as Jaysuk
 Puja Joshi as Jigna 
 Hardik Sangani as Susheel 
Anang Desai as Pratap Rai 
Sangeeta Khanayat as Kiran
Monaz Mevawalla as Sweety 
Sanchi Peswani as Kunjbala 
Purvi Vyas as Shobha
Hemang Dave as Dhilesh Kumar

Production 
Directed and Produced by Dharmessh Mehta under the banner of Namanraj Productions Pvt Ltd, Written by Amit Aaryan and dialogues have been written by Sanjay Chhel.

Development  
First motion poster was released on16th April 2022, Official trailer of the movie launched on 12 May 2022 on official YouTube Channel of Dharmessh. and well known film critic Taran Adarsh made the announcement of the trailer on his social media. The trailer launch and music launch event carried out in mumbai on May 11, 2022. The entire audio juke box of the film is also released on the 12th May 2022.  and the music has acquired by Zee Music Company. For the marketing and promotion Shemaroo Entertainment and Colors Gujarati has joined hands on the project. The music of the film has given by Kashyap Sompura. The title track of the film sung by Sukhwinder Singh, The love Aankhone Aaresong by Palak Muchhal and Javed Ali and Naughty Naughty song has been sung Bhoomi Trivedi released in cinema on 3 June 2022.

Soundtrack

Tracklist
The soundtrack of the album is composed by Kashyap Sompura with lyrics written by Medha Antani. The soundtrack album consists of Three tracks. Three song of the film has been released by Zee Music Company

References

External links
 

2022 films
2020s Gujarati-language films
Films set in Ahmedabad
Films shot in Ahmedabad
Films shot in Gujarat